The Hollenfelz House, also known as St. Mary's High School for Boys, is a historic building located in Dubuque, Iowa, United States.  This highly decorative Second Empire structure was built as a home for Michael Hollenfelz, who owned a wholesale firm dealing with wines, liquors and beer.  The building features a mansard roof with dormers and a cupola, which is normal for this style, and High Victorian decorative details, which is not.  Particularly unusual is the cornice and the stringcourses.  In 1906 it was acquired by St. Mary's Catholic Church across the street for a boy's high school.  The school was operated by the Brothers of Mary from St. Louis, and its curriculum focused on business and commerce.  That school ceased operations in 1929 and the building was then used for the parish grade school.  In 1957 it was converted into an apartment building.  It was individually listed on the National Register of Historic Places in 1977, and it was included as a contributing property in the Washington Residential Historic District in 2015.

References

Houses completed in 1891
Second Empire architecture in Iowa
Apartment buildings in Dubuque, Iowa
National Register of Historic Places in Dubuque, Iowa
Houses on the National Register of Historic Places in Iowa
1891 establishments in Iowa
Individually listed contributing properties to historic districts on the National Register in Iowa